The Spanish-language surname Molinero literally meaning "miller" may refer to:

Abel Molinero, Spanish footballer
Abel Molinero Pons, Spanish footballer
Emilio Molinero Hurtado, Mexican potter
Francisco Molinero, Spanish footballer
Florencia Molinero

Spanish-language surnames